Lupinus pusillus, the rusty lupine or dwarf lupine, is an annual plant in the legume family (fabaceae) found in the Colorado Plateau and Canyonlands region of the southwestern United States(California), and north to Montana.

Description

Growth pattern
"Pusillus'' is for the small size of the plant.

Leaves and stems

Plant stems and leaf stems (petioles) have long spreading hairs.

Inflorescence and fruit
It blooms from April to June.

Flowers are in stalks of 4-38 and bluish to purple or bicolored, with a yellow spot on the upper petal.

Seedpods are nearly oval and have constrictions separating the seeds.

Habitat and range
It can be found in desert shrubland and pinyon juniper woodland communities, from as far north as Washington, to California, and throughout the southwest.

When growing in reddish sand, the blue flowers make a striking contrast with the sun at a low angle.

Ecological and human interactions
It is pollinated by bees.

References

pusillus
Flora of the Western United States
Annual plants
Flora without expected TNC conservation status